Trebia or Trebbia can refer to:

The Trebbia River, in Italy
Trebia (ancient Latin town)
The Battle of the Trebia, 18 December 218 BC
The Battle of Trebia (1799)
Villa del Trebbio, a Tuscan villa
Trebbiano, a grape